Bukera Sharif is a town and union council of Tando Allahyar District in the Sindh Province of Pakistan. It is part of Tando Allahyar Taluka located in the south-west of the district.

See also
 Ramapir Temple Tando Allahyar

References

Union councils of Sindh
Populated places in Sindh